The Recopa Catarinense, is a super cup tournament organized by the FCF reuniting the winners of Campeonato Catarinense and Copa Santa Catarina of each season, since 2019.

List of champions

Following is the list with all the champions of the Recopa Catarinense.

Titles by team

References

External links
 Federação Catarinense de Futebol

Football competitions in Santa Catarina